Alan James Finley (born 10 December 1967) is an English former professional footballer who played in the Football League for Carlisle United, Rochdale, Shrewsbury Town and Stockport County.

References

1967 births
Living people
English footballers
Association football defenders
English Football League players
Footballers from Liverpool
Marine F.C. players
Shrewsbury Town F.C. players
Stockport County F.C. players
Carlisle United F.C. players
Rochdale A.F.C. players
Northwich Victoria F.C. players
Runcorn Town F.C. players
Altrincham F.C. players